Dick Bergström (February 15, 1886 – August 17, 1952) was a Swedish sailor who competed in the 1912 Summer Olympics. He was a crew member of the Swedish boat Erna Signe, which won the silver medal in the 12 metre class. His brother is Kurt Bergström.

References

External links
profile

1886 births
1952 deaths
Swedish male sailors (sport)
Sailors at the 1912 Summer Olympics – 12 Metre
Olympic sailors of Sweden
Olympic silver medalists for Sweden
Olympic medalists in sailing
Medalists at the 1912 Summer Olympics